Kiribati competed at the 2019 World Championships in Athletics in Doha, Qatar, from 27-6 October 2019.

Results

Men
Track and road events

References

Nations at the 2019 World Athletics Championships
World Championships in Athletics
Kiribati at the World Championships in Athletics